Tumsar Assembly constituency is one of the 288 Vidhan Sabha (legislative assembly) constituencies in Maharashtra state in central India. This constituency is one of the three constituencies located in the Bhandara district.

Tumsar is part of the Bhandara-Gondiya Lok Sabha constituency along with five other Vidhan Sabha segments, namely Sakoli and Bhandara in Bhandara district and Gondiya, Arjuni Morgaon and Tirora in the Gondia district.

Members of Legislative assembly

See also
 Tumsar
 List of constituencies of Maharashtra Vidhan Sabha

References

Assembly constituencies of Maharashtra
Bhandara district